Everybody Everywhere is the first live album released by Australian rock and pop band The Badloves. The album was recorded in 1996 and includes tracks from the band's two studio albums, Get On Board and Holy Roadside. The album was released in 1997, with a limited edition coming with a bonus VHS Holy Roadside  - The Film.

Track listing

Charts

Release history

References

1997 live albums
The Badloves albums
Mushroom Records live albums
Live albums by Australian artists